Canna species have been categorised by two different taxonomists in the course of the last three decades. They are Paul Maas, from the Netherlands and Nobuyuki Tanaka from Japan. Both reduced the number of species from the 50-100 that had been accepted previously, and assigned most to being synonyms. Inevitably, there are some differences in their categorisations, and the individual articles on the species describe the differences.

The reduction in the number of species is also confirmed by work done by Kress and Prince at the Smithsonian Institution, however, this only covers a subset of the species range. 

Tanaka's 2001 Taxonomic revision of the family Cannaceae in the New World and Asia is one source of species names, allied with the proposal to conserve the name Canna tuerckheimii over C. latifolia. The most exhaustive work on Canna synonyms is that in the World Checklist of Selected Plant Families (WCSP).

List of species
The following list is based on the Taxonomic revision of the family Cannaceae in the New World and Asia, by Tanaka and the proposal to conserve the name Canna tuerckheimii over C. latifolia. , the World Checklist of Selected Plant Families and Plants of the World Online regard many of these as synonyms (most of Canna indica) but also recognise two further species, making 12 in total.

Cultivar type names
In addition, several species have been given cultivar-type names, and those are listed below:

See also
 List of Canna cultivars
 List of Canna hybridists

References

Further reading
 Chaté, E. - Le Canna, 1866.
 Cooke, Ian (2001) The Gardener's Guide to Growing Cannas, Timber Press. 
 Johnson's Gardner's Dictionary, 1856.
 Khoshoo, T.N. & Guha, I. - Origin and Evolution of Cultivated Cannas. Vikas Publishing House.
 Kress, W. J. 1990. The phylogeny and classification of the Zingiberales. Ann. Missouri Bot. Gard. 77: 698—721. 
 Kress, W. J. and D. E. Stone. 1982. Nature of the sporoderm in monocotyledons, with special reference to the pollen grains of Canna and Heliconia. Grana 21: 129—148. 
 Maas, P. J. M. 1985. 195. Cannaceae. In: A. R. A. Görts-van Rijn, ed. 1985+. Flora of the Guianas. Series A: Phanerogams. 1212+ volsfasc. Königstein. VolFasc. 1, pp. xx—xx69—73 . 
 Maas, P. J. M. and H. Maas. 1988. 223. Cannaceae. In: G. Harling et al., eds. 1973+. Flora of Ecuador. 5660+ volsnos. Göteborg. VolNo. 32, pp. 1–9. 
 Moore, Thomas. 1892. The Gardener's Assistant. Blackie & Son Ltd.
 Percy-Lancaster, S., In an Indian Garden. 1927.
 Robinson W., The Subtropical Garden, John Murray, Albemarle St, London, England. 1879.
 Rogers, G. K. 1984. The Zingiberales (Cannaceae, Marantaceae, and Zingiberaceae) in the southeastern United States. J. Arnold Arbor. 65: 5—55. 
 Segeren, W & Maas, PJM - The genus Canna in northern South America (1971), Acta Botanica Neerlandica. 20(6): 663-680.
 Tanaka, N. 2001. Taxonomic revision of the family Cannaceae in the New World and Asia. Makinoa ser. 2, 1:34–43.
 Woodson, R. E. Jr. and R. W. Schery. 1945. Cannaceae. In: R. E. Woodson Jr. et al., eds. 1943—1981. Flora of Panama. 41 fasc. St. Louis. [Ann. Missouri Bot. Gard. 32: 74—80.]

External links

 Cannaceae in Flora of North America
 World Checklist of Selected Plant Families
 Kew Gardens, London. Search PIC database
 Proposal to conserve the name Canna tuerckheimii
 PRINCE, LINDA M.* and W. JOHN KRESS. Smithsonian Institution, NMNH - Botany, MRC-166, Washington, DC 20560-0166. - Species boundaries in Canna (Cannaceae): evidence from nuclear ITS DNA sequence data.
 University of South Florida, Institute for Systematic Botany

List of Canna species
Canna